Charlotte Boisjoli (June 12, 1923 – January 30, 2001) was an actress, director, writer and educator in Quebec, Canada.

She was born in Quebec City and first performed with the theatre group Compagnons de Saint-Laurent. She earned a master's degree in musicology.

Boisjoli appeared in the television series . During the 1950s, she provided the voice for the character Pépinot on the television show Pepinot and Capucine. She also performed on stage and on the radio.

She was co-founder and director of the École de théâtre ABC. She taught dramatic arts at various schools.

Boisjoli died of cancer at the age of 77 in Montreal. Her memorial is located at the Notre Dame des Neiges Cemetery.

Her son  was a Quebec radio and television personality.

Rue Charlotte-Boisjoli in Boisbriand was named in her honour.

Works 
 La Chatte blanche - 1981
 Le Dragon vert - 1983
 Dis-moi qui je suis : exercices d'improvisation - 1984
 The Heat Line (La ligne de chaleur) - 1987
 13, rue de Buci - 1989
 Jacynthe - 1990

References

External links 
 

1923 births
2001 deaths
Writers from Quebec City
Canadian theatre managers and producers
Women theatre managers and producers
Actresses from Quebec City
Canadian stage actresses
Canadian television actresses
Canadian voice actresses
Burials at Notre Dame des Neiges Cemetery